The N69 road is a national secondary road in Ireland. It runs from Limerick to Tralee and passes through Mungret, Clarina, Kildimo, Askeaton (bypassed), Foynes, Loghill, Glin, Tarbert, and Listowel.

Upgrades
The N22/N69 Tralee Bypass opened on 16 August 2013. Four kilometres of dual carriageway were added to the N69, the first such section to be included in this route. The N69 now terminates at the Ballingowan Roundabout on the N22/N69 Tralee Bypass.

Route
The N69 start at Limerick on the N18 west Limerick bypass which was opened in 2010. It pass though the villages of Mungret, Clarina, Ferrybridge and Kildimo. This section of N69 is the busiest with average traffic volumes of 8,000 daily. It passed Askeaton, which was bypassed since 1990 with 5km of good standard road. After passing though port town of Foynes, it also pass though villages of Loghill and Glin before crossing into County Kerry. In Tarbert it has a junction for N67 before left for Listowel. Some sections of road between Listowel and Tarbert have hidden dip and have few sharp bends. The N69 pass busy market town of Listowel which has a one way traffic system through the town. After Listowel, the N69 terminates at Ballingown when Tralee bypass was opened in 2013. Prior to 2013, it used to go through Tralee.

References
Roads Act 1993 (Classification of National Roads) Order 2006 – Department of Transport

National secondary roads in the Republic of Ireland
Roads in County Kerry
Roads in County Limerick